Scotobiini is a tribe of darkling beetles in the family Tenebrionidae. There are about six genera in Scotobiini, found in the Neotropics.

Genera
These genera belong to the tribe Scotobiini:
 Ammophorus Guérin-Méneville, 1831
 Diastoleus Solier, 1838
 Emmallodera Blanchard, 1842
 Leptynoderes Solier, 1838
 Pumiliofossorum Silvestro & Giraldo-Mendoza, 2015
 Scotobius Germar, 1823

References

Further reading

 
 

Tenebrionoidea